"The Savage" is a song by British group the Shadows, released as a single in November 1961. It peaked at number 10 on the UK Singles Chart.

Background and release
"The Savage" was released as a "double-sided hit" with "Peace Pipe". Both songs were written and produced by Norrie Paramor and the single was released to promote the film The Young Ones, which starred Cliff Richard.

Reviewing for Disc, Don Nicholl described "The Savage" as "a quite, twangy offering with quick, turbulent pace to it". He described "Peace Pipe" as "a more mellow melody. Flows along smoothly and is neatly played by the group".

The Shadows' Hank Marvin said that "The Savage" "is undoubtedly a mediocre record and should never have been released as a single", as "it hasn't a strong enough melody for a single release. It is a run-of-the-mill number with little to recommend it". The group learned of the planned release of the single whilst they were on tour in Australia. They tried to stop it being released, but the record company said they had already pressed 100,000 copies and that it was too late.

Track listings
7": Columbia / DB 4726
 "The Savage" – 2:22
 "Peace Pipe" – 2:11

Personnel
 Hank Marvin – electric lead guitar
 Bruce Welch – acoustic rhythm guitar
 Jet Harris – electric bass guitar
 Tony Meehan – drums

Charts

References

1961 singles
Rock instrumentals
1961 songs
Song recordings produced by Norrie Paramor
Columbia Graphophone Company singles
The Shadows songs
1960s instrumentals